Omdurman Al'ahllia school is located in the Sudan Omdurman area of Wad Nubawy. It neighbors the Khartoum University's Faculty of Education and is located east of the Ahmed Sharffy cemetery.

History
This school is regarded as the first of the three most distinguished schools in Omdurman, second to Wady Saydna and Almotammar School, but attendance has been lost since 1990 to private education.

References

External links
 
 

Educational institutions with year of establishment missing
Schools in Sudan
Omdurman